Ciclindole (INN; WIN-27,147-2), also known as cyclindole (USAN), is an antipsychotic with a tricyclic structure that was never marketed. It displaces spiperone binding in vitro and elevates dopamine levels in the striatum, indicating it acts as a D2 receptor antagonist.

See also 
 Flucindole
 frovatriptan
 alpha-N,N-Trimethyltryptamine
 Iprindole

References 

Dimethylamino compounds
Antipsychotics
Carbazoles
Tricyclic antidepressants